Łukasz Kubot and Édouard Roger-Vasselin were the defending champions, but Kubot chose not to participate this year. Roger-Vasselin played alongside Julien Benneteau, but lost in the first round to Marcus Daniell and Marcelo Demoliner.

Julio Peralta and Horacio Zeballos won the title, defeating Mate Pavić and Michael Venus in the final, 6–3, 7–6(7–4).

Seeds

Draw

Draw

References
 Main Draw

Doubles